California Mountain Snake may refer to:

A shortened name for the California mountain kingsnake.
California Mountain Snake is also the codename of Daryl Hannah's character Elle Driver in the Kill Bill movies, directed by Quentin Tarantino.